Shilu Subdistrict is a former subdistrict of Gusu District, Suzhou, Jiangsu, China. The subdistrict was abolished on March 24, 2017, when it was merged into Jinchang Subdistrict.

Administrative divisions 
In 2016, before its abolition, Shilu Subdistrict administered the following 7 residential communities:

 Caixiang First Village South District Community
 Caixiang First Village Third District Community
 Caixiang First Village Fourth District Community
 Jialing Community
 Xinji Community
 Sanlewan Community
 Zhujiazhuang Community

See also
Jinchang Subdistrict
List of township-level divisions of Suzhou

References

Gusu District
Former township-level divisions of Suzhou